Averinskaya is a rural locality (a village) in Dvinitskoye Rural Settlement, Syamzhensky District, Vologda Oblast, Russia. The population was 67 as of 2002.

Geography 
Averinskaya is located 60 km northeast of Syamzha (the district's administrative centre) by road. Zakharovskaya is the nearest rural locality.

References 

Rural localities in Syamzhensky District